The Mirror Effect is a Big Finish Productions audio drama featuring Lisa Bowerman as Bernice Summerfield, a character from the spin-off media based on the long-running British science fiction television series Doctor Who.

Plot 
Inside the derelict remains of an old mining station, there's a mirror. And inside the mirror, trapped with distorted versions of her friends, is Bernice Summerfield.

Cast
Bernice Summerfield - Lisa Bowerman
Jason Kane - Stephen Fewell
Irving Braxiatel - Miles Richardson
Adrian Wall - Harry Myers
Joseph the Porter - Steven Wickham
Doctor Carnivel - Beverley Cressman

External links
Mirror Effect Photoshop
Big Finish Productions - Professor Bernice Summerfield: The Mirror Effect

Bernice Summerfield audio plays
Fiction set in the 27th century